Area 13 can refer to:

 Area 13 (NTS), the site of the Project 57 nuclear test program
 Brodmann area 13